USS Guadalupe may refer to the following ships of the United States Navy:

 , a United States Navy replenishment oiler in commission from 1941 to 1974
 , a United States Navy fleet replenishment oiler in service since 1992

United States Navy ship names